Antonio Tarsia (1662–1739) was an Italian sculptor.  He was born in Venice.  Tarsia was mentor and father-in-law to sculptor Antonio Corradini.

References

17th-century Italian sculptors
Italian male sculptors
18th-century Italian sculptors
1662 births
1739 deaths
18th-century Italian male artists